Nicol Raidman (11 June 1986) is a USSR-born Israeli figure,  businesswoman and philanthropist's wife. She participated in two seasons of the Israeli reality show Me'usharot, Israel's answer to The Real Housewives franchise.

Born in Odessa, Ukrainian SSR, USSR, Raidman is an only child. Her father is a businessman, and her mother is a musician who ran the Conservatory in Ukraine and the "Tower of Light (theatre)", a Yiddish musical theater in Odessa. Nicol herself learned to play the saxophone in her youth.

In 1996, ten-year-old Raidman and her family emigrated to Israel. She worked as a salesperson in a toy shop. At the end of high school, she enrolled in communications and international relations at the Open University while working as a makeup artist and a production assistant.

In 2011 she opened a luxury clothing store, "Madame de Pompadour", in Tel Aviv. In April 2013, she launched a perfume bearing the name of the store and sold exclusively duty-free.

In 2019 she launched her singing career. Aki Avni appears as her love interest in two music videos.

Personal life
Raidman was married to the entrepreneur, Michael Cherney. They have two children together, Michelle and Richard. They parted in mid 2019.

She is close friends with Sara Netanyahu, wife of Israeli politician, Benjamin Netanyahu.

Philanthropy

In 2014, during Operation Protective Edge, she donated NIS 300,000 to immediately buy protective vests for combat Israeli soldiers,
and another NIS 200,000 to buy food and clothing for soldiers.

References

External links
Official website

Israeli philanthropists
20th-century Israeli businesswomen
20th-century Israeli businesspeople
1986 births
Living people
Ukrainian emigrants to Israel
Israeli pop singers
Israeli people of Ukrainian-Jewish descent
21st-century Israeli women singers